= Nekmese =

Nekmese is a village in the East Nusa Tenggara province of Indonesia. It is situated on the island of Timor.
